The Hancock Street Fourplex is a complex located in northeast Portland, Oregon listed on the National Register of Historic Places.

See also
 National Register of Historic Places listings in Northeast Portland, Oregon

References

1928 establishments in Oregon
Houses completed in 1928
Irvington, Portland, Oregon
Apartment buildings on the National Register of Historic Places in Portland, Oregon
Portland Historic Landmarks